Syd Miller may refer to:
 Syd Miller (rugby union)
 Syd Miller (cartoonist)

See also
 Sid Miller (disambiguation)
 Syd Millar, rugby union prop from Northern Ireland